The Euthanasia Society of America was founded in 1938 to promote euthanasia. It was co-founded by Charles Francis Potter and Ann Mitchell. Alice Naumberg (mother of Ruth P. Smith) also helped to found the group.

The group initially supported both voluntary and involuntary euthanasia. Many of its early board of directors (including co-founders Potter and Mitchell, Clarence Cook Little, Robert Latou Dickinson and Oscar Riddle), as well as prominent supporters of the movement (such as Clarence Darrow, Sherwood Anderson, Abraham Wolbarst, Madison Grant, William J. Robinson and Willystine Goodsell) were also eugenicists; many of these supported gassing those considered to have a developmental disability. However, in 1941 Mitchell condemned the Nazi involuntary euthanasia programme, adding: "we are definitely opposed to the illegal, unregulated and surreptitious 'mercy-killings' by individuals, however much we may sympathize with the humane motive which often actuates them".

In 1967, the group helped Luis Kutner promote the first living will in a speech to the Society. In 1974, the group was renamed the Society for the Right to Die and later merged with Concern for Dying, the two becoming Choice in Dying in 1991.

References 

1938 establishments in the United States
Organizations established in 1938
Euthanasia in the United States